The Nishinomiya Bruins are an American football team located in Nishinomiya, Hyogo, Japan.  They are a member of the X-League X2 division.

Team history
1988 Started as a club of 12 volunteers from the Hankyu Department Store.
1989 Team formerly established with sponsorship from the Hankyu Department Store.
1990 Joined the X-League X2 division.
2002 Promoted from X2 to X1. Finished 5th in the West division (1 win, 4 losses).
2004 Finished 6th in the West division (0 wins, 5 losses). Lost X1-X2 replacement match. Demoted to X2 for the following season.
2011 Finished 1st in the X2 West division (5 wins, 2 losses). Won X2-X1 promotion game against the Fuji Xerox J-Stars 25-5. Promoted to X1 for the following season.
2012 Hankyu Department Store ends team sponsorship. Team renamed the Nishinomiya Bruins. Finished 6th in the X1 West division (2 wins, 7 losses). Won X1-X2 replacement match against the Fuji Xerox J-Stars 23-20 OT.
2013 Finished 5th in the X2 West division (3 wins, 6 losses).
2014 Finished 6th in the X1 West division (3 wins, 6 losses). Won X1-X2 replacement game against the Fuji Xerox J-Stars 30-0.
2015 Finished 0-2 in the Green Bowl Spring Tournament. Demoted to X2 for the Fall tournament. Finished 4th in the X2 West division (2 wins, 3 losses).

Seasons

References

External links
  (Japanese)

American football in Japan
Nishinomiya
1988 establishments in Japan
American football teams established in 1988